Paul Durham (born September 9, 1968) is an American musician and producer, a solo singer-songwriter and the lead singer of rock bands Black Lab, Stray Palace, and Cake or Death.

He is the writer of two Billboard charting songs, "Wash it Away" and "Time Ago" from Black Lab's Geffen Records debut, Your Body Above Me, and is represented by EMI Music Publishing and Secret Road Music.

Discography

Albums
1997: Your Body Above Me
2003: I Feel Fine
2004: Ten Million Years - Songs from the Nineteen Nineties
2005: See the Sun
2006: Cake or Death
2006: Your Body Above Me - The Directors Cut
2007: Passion Leaves a Trace
2007: Technologie
2008: Mirror Ball Associates: Covers, Vol. 1
2009: Stray Palace EP
2010: Two Strangers
2011: Stray Palace - The Diamond EP
2012: Best of the MP3 of the Month Club
2014: A Raven has my Heart
2015: Live Acoustic from the Mercury Lounge
2016: A New World

Soundtracks and licenses 
Spider-Man: "Learn to Crawl"
House M.D. (Season 07 Episode 16): "This Night"
Pretty Little Liars: "Say Goodbye"
Blade: Trinity: "This Blood"
Buffy the Vampire Slayer: "Keep Myself Awake"
Can't Hardly Wait: "Tell Me What to Say"
The Covenant: "River of Joy" (trailer)
Lovewrecked: "Broken Heart", "Weightless", "Perfect Girl" and "Lonely Boy"
Permanent Midnight: "Horses"
The Shield: "This Night" (Season 6 promo)
Varsity Blues:"Black Eye"
The Benchwarmers: "Good"
Waiting for Forever: "Mine Again" (trailer)
Numb3rs: "Good"
Six Degrees: "Rise"
Flashpoint: "Weightless"

Compilation appearances 
 "Your Ghost" on Hot Hands: A Tribute to Throwing Muses & Kristin Hersh (Kuma-chan Records, 2003)

See also
Black Lab

References

External links 
 Black Lab's Official website
 Official Website of Paul Durham

1968 births
Living people
American rock songwriters
American male singer-songwriters
American multi-instrumentalists
American rock singers
People from Twin Falls, Idaho
Record producers from Idaho
Black Lab members
Singer-songwriters from Idaho